Mogurnda is a genus of freshwater fishes in the family Eleotridae native to eastern and northern Australia and New Guinea. Several species are endemic to Lake Kutubu in Papua New Guinea.

Species
The currently recognized species in this genus are:
 Mogurnda adspersa Castelnau, 1878 ([southern] purple-spotted gudgeon)
 Mogurnda aiwasoensis G. R. Allen & Renyaan, 1996
 Mogurnda arguni G. R. Allen & Hadiaty, 2014 
 Mogurnda aurifodinae Whitley, 1938 (northern mogurnda)
 Mogurnda cingulata G. R. Allen & Hoese, 1991 (banded mogurnda)
 Mogurnda clivicola G. R. Allen & A. P. Jenkins, 1999 (Flinders Ranges mogurnda)
 Mogurnda furva G. R. Allen & Hoese, 1986 (black mogurnda)
 Mogurnda kaifayama G. R. Allen & A. P. Jenkins, 1999
 Mogurnda kaimana G. R. Allen & Hadiaty, 2014 
 Mogurnda kutubuensis G. R. Allen & Hoese, 1986 (Lake Kutubu mogurnda)
 Mogurnda larapintae Zietz (fi), 1896 (desert mogurnda)
 Mogurnda lineata G. R. Allen & Hoese, 1991 (Kokoda mogurnda)
 Mogurnda maccuneae A. P. Jenkins, Buston & G. R. Allen, 2000
 Mogurnda magna G. R. Allen & Renyaan, 1996
 Mogurnda malsmithi G. R. Allen & Jebb, 1993
 Mogurnda mbuta G. R. Allen & A. P. Jenkins, 1999
 Mogurnda mogurnda J. Richardson, 1844 (Northern trout gudgeon)
 Mogurnda mosa A. P. Jenkins, Buston & G. R. Allen, 2000
 Mogurnda oligolepis G. R. Allen & A. P. Jenkins, 1999 (Kimberley mogurnda)
 Mogurnda orientalis G. R. Allen & Hoese, 1991 (eastern mogurnda)
 Mogurnda pardalis G. R. Allen & Renyaan, 1996
 Mogurnda pulchra Horsthemke & Staeck, 1990 (Moresby mogurnda)
 Mogurnda spilota G. R. Allen & Hoese, 1986 (blotched mogurnda)
 Mogurnda thermophila G. R. Allen & A. P. Jenkins, 1999 (Dalhousie mogurnda)
 Mogurnda variegata Nichols, 1951 (variegated mogurnda)
 Mogurnda vitta G. R. Allen & Hoese, 1986 (striped mogurnda)
 Mogurnda wapoga G. R. Allen, A. P. Jenkins & Renyaan, 1999

References

 
Eleotridae
Taxonomy articles created by Polbot